Molde is a municipality in Møre og Romsdal county, Norway.

Molde may also refer to:

People
Al Molde, a former college Athletics Director and American football coach
Isa Molde, a Filipino volleyball player
Ivar Molde, a Norwegian politician for the Christian Democratic Party

Places

Norway
Molde (town), a town in Molde Municipality in Møre og Romsdal county, Norway
Molde Cathedral, a cathedral in Molde Municipality in Møre og Romsdal county, Norway
Molde Airport, Årø, an airport in Molde Municipality in Møre og Romsdal county, Norway
Molde Archipelago, an island group in Molde Municipality in Møre og Romsdal county, Norway
Molde University College, a college in Molde Municipality in Møre og Romsdal county, Norway
Molde (river), a river in Molde Municipality in Møre og Romsdal county, Norway

Romania
Molde or Baia, a commune in the Suceava County, Romania

Sports
Molde FK, an association football club in Molde, Norway
Molde Elite, a handball club in Molde, Norway